DemonFM is a student radio station based at De Montfort University in Leicester, England. The station broadcasts online during term time. It was established in 1995 by the Communications Officer of the time, Rob Martin. The first licensed broadcast was on 106.4 FM from 29 September 1995 to 26 October 1995 and the second broadcast was on 106.2 FM from 22 April 1996 to 19 May 1996. DemonFM continued to broadcast on Restricted Service Licences until 2008 with the last of the RSL broadcasts taking place on 97.5FM.  DemonFM finished their 26th and final RSL on 30 November 2008.

DemonFM then held a community radio licence between May 2009 and 2019 with 24-hour broadcasts every day. It broadcast on 107.5FM with coverage over the Greater Leicester Area (with approximately five miles coverage from the university campus). DemonFM had its community radio licence renewed for a further five years in 2014 with its last broadcast on FM taking place on Friday 3 May 2019.

The station is part of De Montfort Students' Union's Demon Media Group which also comprises The Demon magazine and Demon TV.

In 2018 a decision was made by the management board of the station to not apply for a second extension of its community radio licence.  While never publicly communicated, the station management told its members that it wished to focus solely on providing an experience for De Montfort University Students.  The Chief Executive Officer of De Montfort University Students' Union Penni Robson cited undesirable administration burdens, costs and an unwillingness to service community broadcasters as the reason for not supporting the renewal of the licence. Leicester Community Radio had indicated a strong willingness to take over the licence with some support from Ofcom, but De Montfort University Students' Union elected to hand back the license to Ofcom rather than transfer to a community organisation, leaving Leicester with one less community radio station and 107.5mhz vacant in the area. Ofcom has announced they have no plans for the foreseeable future to advertise any further FM community radio licences in Leicester, leaving this frequency vacant for the foreseeable future.

The station now broadcasts from 8 AM to midnight during term time.

Station facilities

DemonFM broadcasts from the Creative Technology Studios within De Montfort University's 'Queens Building'.  It previously broadcast from the Students' Union's 'Campus Centre' building.  In addition to the studio, equipment hire and pre-production facilities are available to students so they can prepare material for their shows.  The station typically runs several outside broadcasts per year including coverage of Varsity sports matches between De Montfort University and the University of Leicester.

The current studio is the fourth building that DemonFM has occupied.  The original studio was a portable building behind the Students' Union building, with fairly basic equipment.  Around 2000 the station moved into what had been a small brick building which had previously been a campus branch of NatWest bank.  With the construction of The Campus Centre and incorporation of De Montfort Students' Union they negotiated a dedicated area and this included a purpose-built floating room to house the studio facilities, with the station moving across in 2003.  When the station began broadcasting under its community licence, a majority of the programming shifted to the Creative Technology Studios in DMU's Queen's Building, with the Campus Centre studio eventually being decommissioned around 2012.

In 2016 De Montfort University funded renovation of the radio control room from which DemonFM broadcasts.  The current setup includes bespoke radio furniture for both talk-based programming and DJ-led shows.

Station management
The day-to-day running of the station is performed by a student committee, elected and appointed annually by members of Demon Media.  This committee is overseen by a board consisting of senior officials from the university, students' union, members of industry, and several students.

Awards

DemonFM won national recognition at the annual Student Radio Awards in 2001 winning the Best Student Station award, following it up in 2007 by taking home the bronze award.

A number of Demon FM nominees and winners have also gone on to careers in the radio and audio industries. In 2010 Talksport host Will Gavin was nominated for Best Male Presenter, while a year later in 2011 Talksport and former Virgin Radio presenter Jon Jackson received the Bronze Award. JACK Radio producer Ed Crofts was nominated alongside Ed Kewn for Best Entertainment Programme in 2013, and more recently in 2017, Abi Gibson received the Silver Award for Best Female.

In April 2020, the station was nominated for 30 I Love Student Radio Awards, with the results to be revealed in May.

Student Radio Association
DemonFM is a member of the Student Radio Association, the national organisation set up to support student radio stations in the UK.  Many of the station's members have actively supported the association through voluntary committee positions, taking on tasks such as organisation of the annual Student Radio Awards.

References

External links
 Demon FM

Radio stations in Leicestershire
De Montfort University
Student radio in the United Kingdom